McFadyen may refer to:

People

Other uses
 McFadyen-Stevens reaction, chemical reaction

See also
 McFadden (disambiguation)
 MacFadyen